Joseph Frederick Weary (born April 12, 1974) is an American former college and professional football player who was a cornerback in the National Football League (NFL) for six seasons during the 1990s and 2000s.  Weary played college football for the University of Florida, was a member of a national championship team, and earned consensus All-American honors.  Thereafter, he played professionally for the New Orleans Saints, Atlanta Falcons and St. Louis Rams of the NFL.

Early years 

Weary was born in Jacksonville, Florida.  He attended Mandarin High School in Jacksonville, where he played for the Mandarin Mustangs high school football team.

College career 

Weary received an athletic scholarship to attend the University of Florida in Gainesville, Florida, and played for coach Steve Spurrier's Florida Gators football team from 1994 to 1997.  As a junior, Weary was a starter on the Gators' 1996 team that defeated the Florida State Seminoles 52–20 in the 1997 Sugar Bowl to win the Bowl Alliance national championship.  As a senior team captain and defensive back for the Gators, Weary had six interceptions, and fifteen in his college career—the most in school history.  He was a first-team All-Southeastern Conference (SEC) selection in 1996 and 1997, and a consensus first-team All-American in 1997.  He finished his four-year college career with fifteen interceptions and thirty-five blocked passes.

Professional career 

Weary was chosen in the fourth round (ninety-seventh pick overall) of the 1998 NFL Draft by the New Orleans Saints, and he played for the Saints from 1998 to 2001.  During his second and third seasons with the Saints, Weary became a regular starter at right cornerback; his fourth year, however, he only started in a single game.

In his six NFL seasons, Weary appeared in eighty-three regular season games, and started twenty-five of them; he recorded 191 tackles, seven interceptions, and one interception return for a touchdown.

See also 

 1997 College Football All-America Team
 Florida Gators football, 1990–99
 List of Florida Gators football All-Americans
 List of Florida Gators in the NFL Draft
 List of New Orleans Saints players
 List of St. Louis Rams players
 List of University of Florida alumni

References

Bibliography 

 Carlson, Norm, University of Florida Football Vault: The History of the Florida Gators, Whitman Publishing, LLC, Atlanta, Georgia (2007).  .
 Golenbock, Peter, Go Gators!  An Oral History of Florida's Pursuit of Gridiron Glory, Legends Publishing, LLC, St. Petersburg, Florida (2002).  .
 Hairston, Jack, Tales from the Gator Swamp: A Collection of the Greatest Gator Stories Ever Told, Sports Publishing, LLC, Champaign, Illinois (2002).  .
 McCarthy, Kevin M.,  Fightin' Gators: A History of University of Florida Football, Arcadia Publishing, Mount Pleasant, South Carolina (2000).  .
 Nash, Noel, ed., The Gainesville Sun Presents The Greatest Moments in Florida Gators Football, Sports Publishing, Inc., Champaign, Illinois (1998).  .

1974 births
Living people
Mandarin High School alumni
Players of American football from Jacksonville, Florida
American football cornerbacks
Florida Gators football players
All-American college football players
New Orleans Saints players
Atlanta Falcons players
St. Louis Rams players
Coaches of American football from Florida
Edward Waters Tigers football coaches